Hans von Burghausen (1350s in Burghausen, Bavaria10 August 1432) was a German architect. He designed the Church of St Martin, Landshut, and completed it in 1498.

Bibliography
 Friedrich Kobler, 1985: Hanns von Burghausen, Steinmetz – Über den gegenwärtigen Forschungsstand zu Leben und Werk des Baumeisters. In: Alte und moderne Kunst, 30, 198/199, pp. 7–16
 Peter Baldass, 1950: Hans Stethaimers wahrer Name. In: Wiener Jahrbuch für Kunstgeschichte. Bd. 14, pp.47-64 
 John W. Cook, 1976: A New Chronology of Hanns von Burghausen's Late Gothic Architecture. In: Gesta. Vol. 15, No. 1/2 = Essays in Honor of Sumner McKnight Crosby, pp. 97–104
 Volker Liedke, 1984: Hanns Purghauser, genannt Meister Hanns von Burghausen, sein Neffe Hanns Stethaimer und sein Sohn Stefan Purghauser, die drei Baumeister an St. Martin in Landshut. In: Volker Liedke, Norbert Nussbaum, Hans Puchta: Beiträge zum Leben und Werk des Meisters Hans von Burghausen. Teil 1 (= Burghauser Geschichtsblätter. Folge 39, pp.1-70. ZDB-ID 342459-5). Stadt Burghausen

1350s births
1432 deaths
People from Burghausen, Altötting
Bavarian architects